Gymnadenia corneliana is a species of orchid with light-pink petals, found only in the Southwestern Alps in a small region near the France-Italy border. It was first catalogued by Swiss botanist Gustave Beauverd. Some specimens of this orchid display slightly darker petals, although this is uncommon. This flower, like many orchids in its genus, is said to emit a pleasant odor resembling that of vanilla.

References

corneliana